Provincial elections were held in Vojvodina on 21 June 2020. Initially organised for 26 April 2020, they were postponed by a state of emergency due to the COVID-19 pandemic in Serbia.

Electoral system
The 120 members of the Assembly are elected by closed-list proportional representation from a single provincial constituency. Seats are allocated using the d'Hondt method with an electoral threshold of 3% of all votes cast (lowered from 5% at the previous elections) although the threshold is waived for ethnic minority parties.

Electoral lists

Results
Just like on the national level, many opposition parties boycotted the elections, leading to the ruling SNS-led For Our Children alliance winning over 60% of both votes and seats.

References

Elections in Vojvodina
Vojvodina
21st century in Vojvodina
Vojvodina
Vojvodina